The EuroBasket 2022 qualification was a basketball competition that was played from November 2017 to February 2021, to determine the 20 FIBA Europe nations who would join the automatically qualified co-hosts Czech Republic, Georgia, Italy, and Germany at the EuroBasket 2022 finals tournament.

Pre-Qualifiers
The EuroBasket 2022 Pre-Qualifiers were played by 17 teams over three rounds. The best eight teams advanced to the EuroBasket 2022 Qualifiers.

First round
The pre-qualifiers first round was played by nine teams: Five eliminated in the 2019 FIBA Basketball World Cup pre-qualifiers, and four teams that did not enter in those qualifiers.

The winner of each group and the best runner-up team qualified for the second round, that gave the option to qualify directly to the EuroBasket qualifiers. The other five teams were dropped to the third round, joining the teams that did not advance to the EuroBasket qualifiers from the second round.

Seeding

All times are local.

Group A

Group B

Group C

Ranking of second-placed teams

Second round
The second round was played between 12 teams: the four teams qualified from the first round, and the eight teams eliminated from the first round of the 2019 World Cup qualification.

The teams were divided into four groups of three teams. The groups were set on 16 January 2018 in Freising, Germany. Each group was formed by one team advanced from the previous round and two teams eliminated from the first round of the 2019 World Cup qualification. The four group winners from this stage qualified to the EuroBasket qualifiers while eight remaining teams were transferred to the third round of pre-qualifiers.

Cyprus replaced Armenia, who withdrew, citing financial concerns.

All times are local.

Group A

Group B

Group C

Group D

Third round
The third round was played in the August 2019. It was joined by the four teams eliminated in the first round and the eight teams that played the second round and did not advance to the EuroBasket qualifiers. Those twelve teams were placed into four groups with three teams each. Every single group was formed by one team eliminated in the first round, one runner-up from the second round and one third-placed finisher from the second round. The group winners from this round advanced to the EuroBasket qualifiers, while the eight remaining teams transferred to the 2023 World Cup pre-qualifiers.

All times are local.

Group E

Group F

Group G

Group H

Qualifiers
The draw was held on 22 July 2019 in Munich, Germany. The four group winners from the second round of the pre-qualifiers; plus the four group winners from the third round of the pre-qualifiers and also the 24 teams who participated in the second round of the FIBA Basketball World Cup qualification all participated in this stage. These matches were played in three windows from 17 to 25 February 2020; from 23 November to 1 December 2020 and from 15 to 23 February 2021 with two games played by each team in every window.

The 32 countries played the FIBA EuroBasket 2022 Qualifiers, including the hosts of the final round – Czech Republic, Georgia, Germany, and Italy. The teams were drawn into eight groups of four teams. The groups were conducted in a round-robin system, with each team playing all other teams in the respective group in home and away games. The three highest-placed teams from each group, except the groups which include the FIBA EuroBasket 2022 hosts, qualified for the FIBA EuroBasket 2022. For the groups containing the FIBA EuroBasket 2022 hosts, the host and the two other highest placed teams qualified for the FIBA EuroBasket 2022.

The eight teams which failed to qualify for the final tournament played the second round of the World Cup 2023 pre-qualifiers in the summer of 2021.

Seeding
The seeding was based on the FIBA World Rankings of 26 February 2019, except seed 8, where teams qualified from the third round of the pre-qualifiers were allocated. On 19 July 2019, the seeding was revealed. In bold, teams that host the final stage. In italics, teams qualified from the pre-qualifiers.

Teams from seed 1 were drawn into the groups A, C, E and G with teams from seeds 4, 5 and 8. Teams from seed 2 were drawn into the groups B, D, F and H with teams from seeds 3, 6 and 7. Only one host of the final stage could be drawn in any group.

Due to the COVID-19 pandemic, each group played the November 2020 window games at a single venue. The same was done for the February 2021 games.

All times are local.

Group A

Group B

Group C

Group D

Group E

Group F

Group G

Group H

Qualified teams
After the 2022 Russian invasion of Ukraine, Russia was expelled from the tournament and replaced by Montenegro.

Notes

References

External links
Qualifiers website
Pre-qualifiers website

qualification
2017–18 in European basketball
2018–19 in European basketball
2019–20 in European basketball
2020–21 in European basketball
2021